Luis Rafael Zarama Pasqualetto (born November 28, 1958) is a Colombian-born American prelate of the Roman Catholic Church who has been serving as the bishop of the Diocese of Raleigh in North Carolina since 2017.  He previously served as an auxiliary bishop of the Archdiocese of Atlanta from 2009 to 2017

Zarama is the first Hispanic and Latino bishop of the Diocese of Raleigh, the first bishop of Raleigh to have been born outside the United States, and the first Colombian to lead a Catholic diocese in the United States.

Biography

Early life 
Luis Zarama was born on November 28, 1958, in Pasto, Nariño, Colombia, the oldest of the six children of Rafael Zarama and Maria Pasqualetto de Zarama. Zarama attended the seminary of Pasto and the Universidad Mariana in Pasto, where he studied philosophy and theology from 1982 to 1987. He began his studies in canon law at the Pontifical Xavierian University in Bogotá in 1987, and earned his licentiate in 1991.  In the mid-1980s, while attending seminary, Zarama also taught at local high schools.

Priesthood 
Emigrating to the United States in 1989, Zarama was ordained into the priesthood by Archbishop John Donoghue for the Archdiocese of Atlanta on November 27, 1993.

Zarama then served as parochial vicar at Sacred Heart Parish in Atlanta until 1996. From 1996 to 2006, he was administrator of St. Helena Mission in Clayton, Georgia and the first Hispanic pastor of St. Mark Parish in Clarkesville, Georgia. Zarama became an American citizen on July 4, 2000, and said: "I'm happy here, I choose to be here, and I feel like I'm part of the system as a citizen." Within the Court of Appeals of the Ecclesiastical Province of Atlanta, he has been advocate (1993–1997) and defender of the bond (1997–present).

Zarama was named assistant director of the Vocations Office in 2000 and vicar general in 2006. He was also a member of the Committee for Continuing Education of Priests and the Priest Personnel Board. In 2007, Zarama was raised by the Vatican to the rank of chaplain of his holiness. In addition to his duties as vicar general, he became judicial vicar in 2008 and served as the archbishop's delegate to North Georgia's Hispanic community.

Auxiliary Bishop of Atlanta 

On July 27, 2009, Zarama was appointed auxiliary bishop of the Archdiocese of Atlanta and titular bishop of Bararus by Pope Benedict XVI. He received his episcopal consecration on September 29, 2009, from then Archbishop Wilton Gregory at the Cathedral of Christ the King in Atlanta. Zarama remained the vicar general and judicial vicar for the archdiocese.

Zarama presided over the Sunday mass and gave the homily at the Steubenville Atlanta Youth Conference in 2016.

Bishop of Raleigh 
On July 5, 2017, Pope Francis appointed Zarama as bishop of the Diocese of Raleigh. He was installed on August 29, 2017, at Holy Name of Jesus Cathedral in Raleigh. He is the first Hispanic and Latino bishop of the Diocese of Raleigh, the first bishop of Raleigh to have been born outside the United States, and the first Colombian-born bishop to lead a Catholic diocese in the United States.

On September 5, 2017, Zarama issued a statement in response to U.S. President Donald Trump's decision to end Deferred Action for Childhood Arrivals (DACA), calling for comprehensive immigration reform.

On August 13, 2018, Zarama responded to the resignation of Cardinal Theodore McCarrick, who sexually abused minors. Zarama stated that he would be praying for the church, for church leadership to be renewed and transformed, and for courage to take the necessary steps to end clerical abuse. He also shared a statement made by Archbishop Gregory. Zarama made another statement on August 17, 2018, regarding the sexual abuse scandal in Pennsylvania, calling the revelations "sad" and "shameful". He voiced his support for the United States Conference of Catholic Bishops' goals to investigate, report, and resolve recent accounts of sexual abuse and for the Church to do so with higher level involvement of the laity. He asked for Catholics to continue to pray for all victims of abuse, stating that they are the Church's priority.

On March 12, 2020, Zarama officially waived the obligation to attend Sunday mass throughout the diocese during the COVID-19 pandemic. On March 14, 2020, Zarama cancelled all weekend masses in the diocese until further notice and directed all Catholic schools in the diocese to comply with Governor Roy Cooper's executive order to close all schools in North Carolina for a minimum of two weeks. On 16 March, Zarama officially suspended all masses, weekday and weekend, throughout the diocese.

Coat of arms
Zarama's coat of arms contains a blue field with an extra wide chevron of gold (yellow). This device gives the illusion of two mountains; a gold one and a blue one. The gold mountain (the chevron) is charged with a scattering (semé) of red crosses to represent Pasto in Colombia." The lower mountain (part of the blue field) has a golden lion's head to represent Mark the Evangelist,  the titular patron of the parish in Clarkesville, Georgia, on a mountain, where Zarama served as pastor. Above the chevron are a gold rose for Thérèse of the Child Jesus, also known as "The Little Flower," and a silver (white) lily for Saint Joseph, who is Zarama's patron saint. Zarama selected as his episcopal motto the Latin phrase Deus Caritas Est (God is love), the title of an encyclical by Pope Benedict XVI.

The achievement is completed with the external ornaments which are a gold episcopal processional cross, that is placed in back of and which extends above and below the shield, and the galero hat, with its six tassels, in three rows, on either side of the shield, all in green. These are the heraldic insignia of a bishop.

See also

 Catholic Church hierarchy
 Catholic Church in the United States
 Historical list of the Catholic bishops of the United States
 List of Catholic bishops of the United States
 Lists of patriarchs, archbishops, and bishops

References

External links

Roman Catholic Diocese of Raleigh
Roman Catholic Archdiocese of Atlanta

1958 births
Living people
Colombian emigrants to the United States
Canon law jurists
Roman Catholic bishops of Atlanta
People from Pasto, Colombia
People from Clarkesville, Georgia
Pontifical Xavierian University alumni
Roman Catholic bishops in North Carolina